Jane Powell (born Suzanne Lorraine Burce; April 1, 1929 – September 16, 2021) was an American actress, singer, and dancer who first appeared in Metro-Goldwyn-Mayer musicals in the 1940s and 50s. With her soprano voice and girl-next-door image, Powell appeared in films, television and on the stage, performing in the musicals A Date with Judy (1948), Royal Wedding (1951), Seven Brides for Seven Brothers (1954), and Hit the Deck (1955).

In the late-1950s, Powell's film career slowed, though she starred in two rare non-musical roles in the film noir The Female Animal, and the adventure film Enchanted Island (both 1958). Powell also made appearances on stage such as in My Fair Lady and The Sound of Music. She also appeared occasionally on television, including recurring guest roles on The Love Boat (1981–1982), as well as the sitcom Growing Pains (1988–1992). She was a veteran of the Golden Age of Hollywood.

Powell returned to the stage in 2000, starring in an Off-Broadway production of Avow and Bounce. In December 2007, she united with the musical group Pink Martini, performing as a vocalist with them in their shared hometown of Portland. She appeared in local theatre productions in Wilton, Connecticut before her death.

Life and career

Early years
Powell was born Suzanne Lorraine Burce, the only child of Paul Emerson Burce and Eileen Baker Burce, on April 1, 1929, in Portland, Oregon. Powell began dance lessons when she was 2 years old. By age 5, Powell had appeared on the Portland children's radio program Stars of Tomorrow. She took dance lessons at the Agnes Peters School of Dance, where the Burce family met a talent scout and dance instructor who convinced the family to move to Oakland, California, to attract Hollywood talent agents. After 3 months of living in a hotel room, the family returned to Portland, and her father took a  job managing a Banbury Cross apartment building. While living in Banbury Cross, Powell took singing lessons.

When Powell was 12 years old, a talent promoter helped her get selected as the Oregon Victory Girl. She began singing on Portland radio station KOIN and traveled Oregon for 2 years, singing and selling victory bonds. While vacationing in California in 1943, Powell won a Hollywood talent show and signed a contract with MGM Theaters in Hollywood the next day at the age of 14.

She wanted to go back to high school and to university, but her mother forbade this as she was the only one making good money.

1943–1950: Contract with Metro-Goldwyn-Mayer 
After signing with MGM, Powell was lent to United Artists for her first film, Song of the Open Road (1944), where she played the character of Jane Powell and took that as her professional name. In 1945, Powell sang "Because" at the wedding of Esther Williams and Ben Gage.

Powell's second feature film was Delightfully Dangerous (1945), then she appeared in Holiday in Mexico (1946), where she met Roddy McDowall, who became a life-long friend.

More films followed, including Three Daring Daughters (1948), A Date with Judy (1948), Luxury Liner (1948), Nancy Goes to Rio (1950), and Two Weeks with Love (1950).

Powell lamented that she only ever got to play the parts of teenage girls. She had got to the age of 25, with children of her own, and still found herself typecast in these roles. Though she accepted that this was the way that she needed to support her family.

In 1949, Powell sang at Harry S. Truman’s inaugural ball, and she sang for five U.S. presidents and the queen of England.

1951–1958: Royal Wedding and Seven Brides for Seven Brothers 

In 1951, Powell starred in the musical comedy Royal Wedding and in Rich, Young and Pretty.

She starred in Small Town Girl and Three Sailors and a Girl in 1953. Powell starred in Seven Brides for Seven Brothers in 1954. In 2006, Seven Brides for Seven Brothers was named one of the greatest American musicals of all time by the American Film Institute. Powell starred in Athena and Deep in My Heart in 1954.

In 1955, Powell starred opposite Tony Martin, Debbie Reynolds, Ann Miller, and Russ Tamblyn in Hit the Deck, which was a commercial failure, underperforming at the box office. The following year, she recorded the song "True Love", which rose to number 15 on the Billboard charts and number 107 on the pop charts for that year, according to the Joel Whitburn compilation. This was her only single to make the charts. Also in 1956, Powell performed the song "I'll Never Stop Loving You" at the 28th Academy Awards. Next, Powell appeared in RKO Pictures' musical comedy The Girl Most Likely, playing a woman who becomes engaged to three men simultaneously. Though shot in 1956, the film was not released until 1958, after RKO went out of business.

Known mainly for her roles in musical comedies, Powell appeared in a rare dramatic role in the film noir The Female Animal (1958) from Universal Pictures, which marked the final film of co-star Hedy Lamarr.

1959–1980: Theater and television 
By the late 1950s, after Powell's contract with MGM expired and her film offers began to slow, she turned to theater. Her first summer stock role was in a production of Oklahoma! in Dallas, Texas, in 1958. The following year, she co-starred with Tab Hunter, Patty Duke, and Myrna Loy in a television remake of the musical Meet Me in St. Louis. She starred in a stage production of The Most Happy Fella (1962). In 1962, Powell made her debut appearance on the television series The Red Skelton Show, in which she appeared in numerous episodes until 1972.

In 1964, Powell starred as Eliza Doolittle in a production of My Fair Lady at Los Angeles' Valley West Theatre, which established a record gross for West Coast-based productions of the play. She also toured in 1964 in a musical review titled Just 20 Plus Me! It was done to a recorded track and featured Powell with 20 handsome "chorus boys". Asked after the performance if the production was going to be made available on a commercial recording, she said simply "No."

She had the title role in The Unsinkable Molly Brown in 1966, as well as the female lead in an Atlanta-based production of Carousel, followed by The Boy Friend at the Carousel Theater in Los Angeles in 1967. Also in 1967, she starred in a touring production of Brigadoon. Next, she portrayed Maria von Trapp in a production of The Sound of Music in 1968. In addition to her stage work, Powell appeared in three television films: Wheeler and Murdoch (1972), The Letters (1973), and Mayday at 40,000 Feet! (1976).

In 1972, Powell appeared in a Cincinnati-based stage production of Meet Me In St. Louis. The following year, Powell made her Broadway debut playing the title character in Irene, following Debbie Reynolds' performance in the title role. Mel Gussow of The New York Times praised Powell's performance, writing: "The two stars are an equal match for peppiness. Miss Reynolds may score a point for clowning, but Miss Powell wins two for softness."

Howard Keel and she appeared on stage together in a revival of Seven Brides for Seven Brothers, I Do! I Do! and South Pacific.

1981–2021: Later years; return to theater 
In the early 1980s, Powell toured in the comedies Same Time, Next Year; The Marriage-Go-Round, and Chapter Two.  
 
Between 1981 and 1982, Powell had guest-starring role on The Love Boat and Fantasy Island. In 1985, she started a 9-month run in the daytime soap opera Loving, playing a tough mother and businesswoman, followed by another guest-starring part on Murder, She Wrote in 1985. In 1988, Powell was cast in a recurring guest role on the popular sitcom Growing Pains, in which she played Irma Seaver, the mother of Dr. Jason Roland Seaver (Alan Thicke). The same year, in May 1988, Powell married her longtime companion, former child actor Dickie Moore. The couple had met while Moore was performing research for his autobiography Twinkle, Twinkle, Little Star, but Don't Have Sex or Take the Car.

In the early 1990s, Powell was a temporary replacement on the soap opera As the World Turns for Eileen Fulton as Lisa Grimaldi. In 1996 and 1997, she appeared in the off-Broadway production After-Play. She also performed the role of the Queen in Rodgers and Hammerstein's Cinderella at New York City Opera. In 2000, Powell appeared in the Off-Broadway production Avow,  in which she portrayed a devout Catholic woman whose gay son wishes to marry his partner in the church. This was followed by a stage production of 70, Girls, 70, the same year. In 2002, she guest-starred on Law & Order: Special Victims Unit, followed by a role in the Showtime film The Sandy Bottom Orchestra (2003).

In 2003, she made a return to the stage as Mama Mizner in the Stephen Sondheim musical Bounce, which held performances in Chicago and Washington, DC. "I auditioned just to meet Sondheim, who was nice and a very funny man,” Powell admitted. "But I was disappointed when I got the part. I didn't really want to be away from home, but I had never done a new show and that seemed exciting at first. But I didn't have much to do and the part wasn't too jovial."

On New Year's Eve 2007, Powell returned to her hometown of Portland, Oregon, to narrate Sergei Prokofiev's Peter and the Wolf with the Portland-based musical group Pink Martini. She also appeared on March 9, 2008, with Pink Martini at Avery Fisher Hall in New York City, singing a duet of "Aba Daba Honeymoon" with lead singer China Forbes.

In March 2009, she appeared and sang "Love Is Where You Find It" in a show in which Michael Feinstein celebrated movie musicals and MGM musicals in particular. She performed again with Pink Martini at the Hollywood Bowl on September 10, 2010. Powell filled in as guest host on Turner Classic Movies  for Robert Osborne when he was on medical leave from July 17–23, 2011.

Personal life 
On November 5, 1949, Powell married former figure skater Gearhardt Anthony Steffen. Her first child, Gearhardt Steffen III, was born July 21, 1951. Powell's second child, Suzanne Ilene Steffen, was born on November 21, 1952. Powell began an affair with Gene Nelson, her co-star in Three Sailors and a Girl. Powell and Nelson divorced their spouses with plans to wed, but Nelson backed out after his divorce. Powell and Steffen divorced in August 1953.

Powell married automobile executive Patrick W. Nerney on November 8, 1954, in Ojai, California. Their daughter, Lindsay Averill Nerney, was born on February 1, 1956. Powell and Nerney divorced in May 1963.

Powell married and divorced twice more before falling for former child-star Dickie Moore in 1982 and marrying him six years later. Following the death of her husband in 2015, Powell sold their Manhattan apartment and relocated permanently to their second home in Wilton, Connecticut. Powell died of natural causes in Wilton on September 16, 2021, at the age of 92.

Legacy 

Powell was referred to as one of the last surviving stars of the Golden Age of Hollywood. She secured her place in history with her performance in  Seven Brides for Seven Brothers.

Despite bouts with severe depression, anxiety and insecurity, Powell retained a public image of the all-American girl-next-door and was a symbol of simpler times. Powell's role in Song of the Open Road in 1944, a film that presented Powell as a wholesome girl next door, was suspected to have pigeon-holed her in future musicals.

In 1960, Powell was awarded a star on the Hollywood Walk of Fame.

Filmography

Features

Short subjects 

Screen Snapshots: Motion Picture Mothers, Inc. (1949)
1955 Motion Picture Theatre Celebration (1955)

Stage work 

Allegro (1951) 
Oklahoma! (1958) 
The Most Happy Fella (1962)
The Unsinkable Molly Brown (1963; 1966; 1981)
Carousel (1966)
The Boy Friend (1967) 
The Sound of Music (1968; 1972)
My Fair Lady (1969; 1971)
I Do! I Do! (1970)
Meet Me in St. Louis (1972) 
Brigadoon (1973) 
Irene (1974; 1975–76) 
Seven Brides for Seven Brothers (1978) 
South Pacific (1978)
The Marriage-Go-Round (1981) 
Sweethearts (1983) 
Cinderella (1995) 
After-Play (1996) 
Ancestral Voices (2000)
Avow (2000) 
Nothing Like a Dame (2000) 
70, Girls, 70 (2000) 
Bounce (2003; 2004)

Radio 
 1944 — Powell played the title role in Snow White and the Seven Dwarfs on Screen Guild Theatre on CBS.
 1947 — Powell co-starred with Frank Sinatra in Songs by Sinatra.
 1952 — Lux Radio Theatre (episode Royal Wedding)

Recordings 
 1949: Romance — Columbia Masterworks LP (ML 2034)
 1949: A Date with Jane Powell — Columbia Masterworks LP (ML 2045)
 1956: Can't We Be Friends? — Verve Records LP (MGV 2023), re-released as a Limited Edition Japanese import CD in a mini-LP slip case in 2004.
 1956: Something Wonderful (with David Rose and His Orchestra) — MGM Records (E3451)
 2000: Hansel and Gretel/Alice in Wonderland — Collectables Records CD
 2001: Romance/A Date with Jane Powell — Collectables Records CD (COL-CD-6670 / Sony A-50271)

Notes

References

Sources

External links 

 
 
 
 
 Jane Powell at Virtual History
 

1929 births
2021 deaths
Actresses from Portland, Oregon
American film actresses
American female dancers
American women singers
American musical theatre actresses
American sopranos
American television actresses
Dancers from Oregon
Metro-Goldwyn-Mayer contract players
Musicians from Portland, Oregon
Singers from Oregon
20th-century American actresses
21st-century American women